In geometric topology, a branch of mathematics, the (−2, 3, 7) pretzel knot, sometimes called the Fintushel–Stern knot (after Ron Fintushel and Ronald J. Stern), is an important example of a pretzel knot which exhibits various interesting phenomena under three-dimensional and four-dimensional surgery constructions.

Mathematical properties 

The (−2, 3, 7) pretzel knot has 7 exceptional slopes, Dehn surgery slopes which give non-hyperbolic 3-manifolds.  Among the enumerated knots, the only other hyperbolic knot with 7 or more is the figure-eight knot, which has 10.  All other hyperbolic knots are conjectured to have at most 6 exceptional slopes.

References

Further reading 

Kirby, R., (1978). "Problems in low dimensional topology", Proceedings of Symposia in Pure Math., volume 32, 272-312. (see problem 1.77, due to Gordon, for exceptional slopes)

External links

3-manifolds
4-manifolds